Stanley Robertson (8 June 1940 – 2 August 2009) was a Scottish storyteller, ballad singer, and piper.

He was born in Aberdeen in 1940 into a Traveller family which had settled there. From his aunt, folk singer Jeannie Robertson, and others including his father, he inherited a huge repertoire of northeast ballads. He was the keyworker for the Heritage Lottery-funded "Oral and Cultural Traditions of Scottish Travellers" project at the Elphinstone Institute, University of Aberdeen, from April 2002 until April 2005.

As a member of the Traveller community, Robertson documented his own lore and that of other members of this group, and promoted the cultural traditions of Scottish Travellers among young people in schools and community groups. His storytelling was affected by the different trades at which he worked, including his long years spent filleting in the Aberdeen fish houses, where he gathered many contemporary stories.

In June 2003, he represented the University of Aberdeen and Scotland at the Smithsonian Institution's Folklife Festival in Washington, D.C.

He published three plays and seven books, some written in his local Scots dialect. He was featured in more than 100 radio programmes and 50 television appearances and made numerous personal appearances on stage and in theatres, schools and colleges.

On 27 November 2008, at age 68, Robertson, who was an Honorary Research Associate at the University of Aberdeen's Elphinstone Institute, was conferred an honorary degree of Master of the University (MUniv), in recognition for the work he had done.

He was a frequent broadcaster and appeared regularly at storytelling festivals. He was an Honorary Founder of the Scottish Storytelling Forum. Stanley died at his home in Aberdeen on Sunday, 2 August 2009.

A musical about Robertson's life by Kyle Jarrow and Bright Lights, Big City composer Paul Scott Goodman tentatively titled Reek Roon is currently under development, reportedly commissioned by Fela! producer Steve Hendel.

In 2016, in memory of Robertson's significant influence as a storyteller, the Grampian Association of Storytellers commissioned the 'Stanley Robertson Award for Traditional Storytelling' to be given out at the Aberdeen Traditional Music and Song Association's yearly competitions. The trophy was created by glassmaker Shelagh Swanson and its first winner was Jane Chalmers.

References

External links
 Stanley Robertson Daily Telegraph obituary
Archive of 37 recordings of ballads sung by Stanley Robertson

British storytellers
Scottish folk singers
Scottish songwriters
Scottish Travellers
Scottish Latter Day Saints
1940 births
2009 deaths
Musicians from Aberdeen
Scottish dramatists and playwrights
20th-century British dramatists and playwrights
20th-century Scottish writers
20th-century Scottish male singers
20th-century Scottish musicians
21st-century British dramatists and playwrights
21st-century Scottish writers
21st-century Scottish male singers
21st-century Scottish musicians